Gleb Bokiy (born in 1970) is a former competitive figure skater who represented the Soviet Union. He won medals at the 1989 Nebelhorn Trophy, 1989 Prague Skate, and Skate Electric International Challenge. He finished eighth at the 1989 World Junior Championships in Sarajevo.

Competitive highlights

References 

1970 births
Soviet male single skaters
Living people
Figure skaters from Moscow